Pinehurst State Airport  is a public airport located 1 mile (1.6 km) southwest of Pinehurst, in Jackson County, Oregon, United States.

External links

Airports in Jackson County, Oregon